The Izmir–Ankara Motorway is a planned  motorway that would connect Izmir, on the Aegean coast, with Ankara, the capital of Turkey. The motorway is expected to be completed by 2023. Despite the name, the motorway would not begin or even run through Izmir, starting near Turgutlu, Manisa at an interchange with the O-5. Near Ankara the route would end at an interchange with the Ankara Beltway.

Route

References

Motorways in Turkey
Toll roads in Turkey